Libnan (  or) is a song by Lydia Canaan. Canaan, who in 1997 was awarded the Lebanese International Success Award by the Lebanese Ministry of Tourism, wrote and recorded the song in 1993 as a loving tribute to her country, Lebanon.

In 2004, the song became the soundtrack of the advertisement "Rediscover Lebanon", produced and broadcast by CNN to over one-billion viewers and commissioned by the Lebanese Ministry of Economy & Trade to promote Lebanon as a tourist destination.

See also 
 Lydia Canaan
 Tourism in Lebanon
 Ministry of Tourism (Lebanon)

References

External links 
  "Libnan"
 Lebanese Ministry of Tourism website

Lydia Canaan songs
2004 songs
Songs about Lebanon